John Vigilante (May 24, 1985 – July 18, 2018) was an American professional ice hockey forward. At the time of his death he was the head coach for the 19u Belle Tire Girls Hockey Program.

Playing career
Undrafted, Vigilante was an Ontario Hockey League priority selection for the Plymouth Whalers in the 11th Round (209th) in 2001. Vigilante was named the team captain of the Whalers at the beginning of the 2005–06 OHL season. He represented the Whalers at the 2006 OHL All-Star Game, held in Belleville, Ontario. His season was cut short with a broken finger, after blocking a shot by the Barrie Colts, as they surged looking for a tying goal at the end of a game. Out for a month, Vigilante returned for the final three games of the regular season to help Plymouth win the West Division.

Vigilante was signed by the Nashville Predators of the National Hockey League (NHL) on December 7, 2005. Vigilante was then assigned to Nashville's American Hockey League (AHL) affiliate, the Milwaukee Admirals, where he made his professional debut.

On July 8, 2008, Vigilante was signed by the Columbus Blue Jackets to a one-year deal. He was then assigned to their AHL affiliate, the Syracuse Crunch, where he played with former Plymouth Whaler teammates Jared Boll and Tom Sestito. Midway through the 2008–09 season on February 21, 2009, Vigilante was reassigned by the Blue Jackets when he was loaned to the Quad City Flames for the remainder of the season.

On September 11, 2009, Vigilante signed with the Grand Rapids Griffins, the Detroit Red Wings' AHL affiliate. After appearing in one preseason game, Vigilante was released from his tryout contract with Detroit and assigned to the Griffins.

On June 1, 2012, Vigilante signed with Swedish team IK Oskarshamn, playing in league Hockeyallsvenskan.

Vigilante was a 2003 graduate of Edsel Ford High School in Dearborn, Michigan.

Coaching career
On April 9, 2014, Vigilante was announced as the new head coach, beginning with the 2014-15 season, of the Compuware Midget Majors of the Compuware Youth Program.

Career statistics

References

External links

1985 births
2018 deaths
American men's ice hockey left wingers
Grand Rapids Griffins players
Ice hockey players from Michigan
IK Oskarshamn players
Madonna University alumni
Milwaukee Admirals players
Sportspeople from Dearborn, Michigan
Plymouth Whalers players
Quad City Flames players
Syracuse Crunch players
Edsel Ford High School alumni